was a Japanese painter and copperplate engraver. A leading figure in Japanese painting during the late Edo period, he is credited with introducing Western painting to Japan.

Biography

Early life 
Aōdō was born  in 1748 in Sukagawa, Mutsu Province (now Fukushima Prefecture), Japan. He was the second son of Sōshirō Nagata, a wealthy farm implement dealer. Upon the death of his father, he helped his older brother, Jokichi, who was a dyer, for a long time. Jokichi had a penchant for painting, and while working in the family business, Zenkichi learned painting from him.

Painting career 
In his painting career, Aōdō employed Western-style painting techniques such as perspective and shading to achieve Western-style copperplate engraving. Adding Edo customs to Shiba Kokan's Western-style landscape paintings, he discovered new landscapes and perfected Western-style landscape copperplate engravings.

Legacy 
Sadaki Ota's Aōdō Denzen Collection, owned by the city museum, was declared an important cultural property of the prefecture in 1986. In 2001, Eiji Tsuburaya biographers cited Aōdō as an ancestor of Tsuburaya, claiming Tsuburaya inherited Aōdō's dexterity.

References

Bibliography

External links 

 Aōdō Denzen at Sukagawa City

1748 births
1822 deaths
Japanese painters
People of Edo-period Japan
19th-century Japanese painters
Japanese landscape painters
Japanese engravers